The Harrogate line is a passenger rail line through parts of North Yorkshire and the West Yorkshire area of northern England connecting Leeds to York by way of Harrogate and Knaresborough. Service on the line is operated by Northern, with a few additional workings by London North Eastern Railway starting and terminating at Harrogate. West Yorkshire Metro's bus and rail MetroCard ticket is available for journeys between Leeds and Harrogate.

Route

History
The routes over which the Harrogate line trains now run were opened in 1848 by two of the railways which came to be part of the North Eastern Railway: the Leeds Northern Railway and the East and West Yorkshire Junction Railway. At the time of the 1923 Grouping the Harrogate area formed the junction for five routes: the main line was that of the Leeds-Northallerton railway; the other lines were to:
 Pateley Bridge;
 Pilmoor on the East Coast Main Line, the junction for the line to York (the only remaining section open)
 Wetherby, the junction with the Cross Gates–Wetherby line;
 Church Fenton, terminus of the Harrogate–Church Fenton line
The Leeds station at the time was Leeds Central station, jointly owned by the NER and the Lancashire and Yorkshire Railway.

The line terminated in Harrogate at the Brunswick station which was opened in 1848 but closed in 1862 when a new and more central station was opened.

Description

The  line is composed of all or part of the following Network Rail routes:

 LNE 9 from Leeds to Leeds West Junction
 LNE 6A from Leeds West Junction

 LNE 6 from Harrogate

 LNE 2 from Skelton Junction to York

Stations and features
Currently open stations are shown in bold font.

 Leeds is a major transport hub where several long-distance and commuter lines meet. Trains scheduled to operate via Harrogate to York are shown with the destination of "Poppleton via Harrogate" because the Leeds-York journey via this route takes 40 minutes longer than on the route of the York and Selby Lines via Garforth.
 Royal Gardens, only a short distance from Burley Park, was closed in 1858.
 Cardigan Road Goods station is closed and now the site of a builders yard.
 Burley Park opened in 1988 making it the newest station on the line 
 Headingley near Kirkstall Lane (B6157 road) is the closest station to the Kirkstall Lane end of Headingley Stadium.
 Horsforth Woodside was located near Leeds Outer Ring Road, today's A6120, and closed in 1864. Opening of a new station here has been discussed on several occasions.
 Horsforth is physically the closest railway station to Leeds & Bradford Airport, though no direct public transport link currently exists between Horsforth station and the Airport terminal.  The closest railway station with a bus link is Guiseley on the busier electrified Wharfedale Line.

 Bramhope Tunnel with a length of 2 miles 220 yd (3418 m) is the longest tunnel on the historic NER system.
 Arthington was a triangular junction for the line to Otley. Both station and branch are now closed.  Plans to reopen the station as a park and ride facility for Pool-in Wharfedale have been mooted by campaigners, but both Otley Town Council and West Yorkshire Metro state that the local road network could not support a park and ride facility.
 Arthington Viaduct
 Weeton serves Huby, Weeton and Otley.
 Pannal serves Pannal, Burn Bridge and Spacey Houses.
 The line climbs and turns sharply, passing the junction with the former Harrogate–Church Fenton line where the short-lived Crimple station was located, and crosses Crimple Valley Viaduct, under which the original main line passed en route to Starbeck. The course of this section (closed in 1951) can be seen from the viaduct.
 Hornbeam Park serves the southern parts of Harrogate, Oatlands and is also the closest station to the Great Yorkshire Showground.
 Harrogate is also served by trains to and from London every 2 hours. The bus station is immediately adjacent.
 Starbeck serves Starbeck and Woodlands. Here were the junctions for the former Nidd Valley Railway to Pateley Bridge and the line to Ripon and Northallerton.
 The line crosses the River Nidd on a four-arch stone viaduct.
 Knaresborough is near Knaresborough High Street (the A59). Here the line to Pilmoor branched off.
 Goldsborough closed to passengers in 1958 and to freight in 1965.
 Hopperton closed to passengers in 1958 and to freight in 1962.
 Cattal serves Cattal, Whixley and Green Hammerton.
 Hammerton serves Green Hammerton and Kirk Hammerton.
 Wilstrop Siding served Copmanthorpe and closed to passengers in 1931, to freight in 1964.
 Marston Moor which served Long Marston closed to passengers in 1958, to freight in 1965 and to parcels in 1967.
 Hessay closed to passengers in 1958 and to freight in 1964.
 Poppleton serves Upper Poppleton and Nether Poppleton.
 York is also served by the East Coast Main Line and by the York and Selby Lines and the Dearne Valley line, trains on the latter two being operated by Northern. At York station, trains travelling to Leeds via Harrogate are shown with the destination of Burley Park as the route takes 40 mins longer via Harrogate

Special services
In addition to the regular services on the Harrogate line, there is occasionally an increased service which runs prior to and after a major event on at Headingley Stadium such as an international cricket test match. The services run between Leeds and Horsforth stations to cater for a large usage at Headingley and Burley Park railway stations, and tickets are sold by Revenue Protection staff at the entrances to the platforms. This is to reduce the queue for tickets at Leeds station. Extra services have also been run on the Harrogate line for the Great Yorkshire Show.

On weekdays a daily morning direct service to London King's Cross operates via Leeds. On 20 January 2011 the Government owned East Coast Franchise Operator (East Coast Trains) announced that following strong local representations an evening return service is to be reinstated, providing a direct train from London to Harrogate 7 days a week from May 2011.

In July 2014, the Tour de France Grand Depart 2014 was held in Yorkshire with stage 1 from Leeds to Harrogate and thousands of spectators were expected. Extra trains were operated in this occasion. In addition to the local trains which were run at increased capacity, two locomotive hauled services ran between Leeds and Harrogate during the day.  Passengers wishing to travel between the depart at Leeds and first day finishing at Harrogate were required to wait separately outside Leeds station rather than proceed through the barriers, given the limited capacity through the station.

Trains

The route is served by Northern Trains rolling stock; the most common seen on the line is the Class 170 Turbostar, and Class 158s sometimes make appearances on the line as well. London North Eastern Railway services use the Class 800 Azuma.

Future
In July 2011, Harrogate Chamber of Commerce proposed electrifying the line with 750 V DC third rail, using D Stock of the London Underground, to substantially increase capacity. The D stock's replacement by S Stock on the District line in 2015 has made them available for other locations. It is proposed that the stock will be converted to use the bottom-contact third rail system. The scheme never gained support from Metro, Northern Rail or National Rail, generally overhead electrification is favoured and is the only method used in the region. Furthermore, the D stock is older than current stock using the line and runs on a fourth rail system.

Several new stations have also been proposed, including at Flaxby and Knaresborough East. In November 2013 Rail Magazine reported on plans for the line to be electrified at 25 kV AC overhead power lines which could be in use by 2019. This would mean that there would be two electric lines to York from Leeds, the other being Leeds to York via Cross Gates which will soon be electrified.

On 5 March 2015, the Harrogate line, amongst others in the area including the Leeds–Bradford Interchange–Halifax line, the Selby–Hull line and the Northallerton–Middlesbrough line were named top priority for electrification; with an estimated cost for the Harrogate line of £93 million with a projected cost-benefit ratio of 1/3.60. No date has been set however.

From December 2017, additional services on Sundays began with an extra hourly service from Leeds to Knaresborough during the day. This means trains between Knaresborough/Harrogate and Leeds are now every 30 minutes during the daytime on Sundays. Funding has been secured for signalling and infrastructure upgrades on the section of line between Knaresborough and York. This will allow an enhanced passenger service of two trains per hour. However, the proposal to re-open  railway station to serve a new housing estate, would jeopardise reliable timings on the train service. The £13 million scheme will be carried out over the summer and autumn of 2020 with improved signalling. This will allow two services an hour between York, Knaresborough and Harrogate.

In December 2019, London North Eastern Railway (LNER), intend to increase their one train a day, between Harrogate and London King's Cross, to six trains each way per day, including weekends. The service will be suitable for an increase in service pattern due to LNER using its bi-mode class 800 Azuma trains that would have previously terminated at Leeds. A siding at the northern end of Harrogate station has been brought back into use to enable the trains to reverse direction.

Since 1 March 2020 services have been directly operated by the Department for Transport (DfT) under the brand name Northern Trains, with an objective of "stabilising performance and restoring reliability for passengers".

The Ripon railway

The city was previously served by Ripon railway station on the Leeds–Northallerton line that ran between Leeds and Northallerton. It was once part of the North Eastern Railway and then LNER.

The Ripon line was closed to passengers on 6 March 1967 and to freight on 5 September 1969 as part of the wider Beeching Axe, despite a vigorous campaign by local campaigners, including the city's MP. Today much of the route of the line through the city is now a relief road and although the former station still stands, it is now surrounded by a new housing development. The issue remains a significant one in local politics and there are movements wanting to restore the line. Reports suggest the reopening of a line between Ripon and Harrogate railway station would be economically viable, costing £40 million and could initially attract 1,200 passengers a day, rising to 2,700. Campaigners call on MPs to restore Ripon railway link.

In North Yorkshire County Council's 'A Strategic Transport Prospectus for North Yorkshire', they propose to build an entirely new railway between Leeds, Harrogate and Ripon which would have a junction with the East Coast Main Line north of Northallerton station. This would enable  running, reduce journey times and provide an alternative route when the current Leeds to York to Northallerton section is closed.

References

External links

Metro line details (fare structure, map etc)
NYCC's web page with the Strategic Transport Prospectus for North Yorkshire

Rail transport in West Yorkshire
Rail transport in North Yorkshire
Transport in Harrogate
Rail transport in York
Transport in Leeds
Railway lines opened in 1848
Railway lines in Yorkshire and the Humber
1848 establishments in England